Operation Bamenda Clean is an ongoing Cameroonian special counter-insurgency operation in Bamenda, Northwest Region, aimed at preventing armed Ambazonian separatists from operating in the city. By January 2021, Cameroon was gradually achieving what a security analyst at the University of Yaoundé called "relative peace" in Bamenda, and the mayor of the city stated that the operation was succeeding. However, as of March 2021, separatist-imposed ghost towns remained widely respected by the local population, and separatists controlled most roads leading in and out of Bamenda.

Background 

Throughout the Anglophone Crisis, armed separatists had used motorcycles to carry out hit-and-run attacks against soldiers and police officers, and the Cameroonian security forces wished to deprive them of bases of operation in the city and its vicinity. On September 4, the Mayor of Bamenda outlawed motorcycles in the city, to which separatists responded by threatening to bring all traffic to a halt. Three days prior to the official launch of the operations, soldiers from the Rapid Intervention Battalion had killed a prominent Ambazonian general in Bamenda named Luca Fonteh, known as the nom de guerre "General Mad Dog".

The rebels in Bamenda include female fighters.

The operation

Aims and rationale

The operation was officially announced on the same day as it commenced on September 8, 2020 a day before the three-year anniversary of the start of the war and 23 days before the Ambazonian Independence Day.

The aims were stated to be to protect civilians from "terrorists" and "criminals" and restore public security in the city. The operation was consistent with Cameroon's general military strategy of focusing on retaining control over all major urban areas in the Anglophone regions, while not trying to recapture all rural areas that had come under separatist control. As of September 2020, separatists openly controlled villages not far from Bamenda.

Timeline of notable events

2020

On September 10, a Cameroonian soldier was killed during clashes with separatists. Ambazonia Defence Forces deputy defense chief Daniel Caapo (based in exile) responded by imploring local civilians to rise up in opposition to Operation Bamenda Clean.
On September 14, two people were summarily executed by soldiers.
On September 21, soldiers summarily executed five civilians in Ngongham, outside Bamenda.
On October 6, several teachers were abducted by alleged separatists.
On October 16, a fire erupted in the building where the command post of the Bamenda Territorial Gendarmerie was located. According to an official statement, the cause had been an accident rather than an act by the separatists, and the fire was put out after two and a half hours.
On November 3, Cameroon accused separatists of attacking the Longla Comprehensive College in Bamenda.
At some point in late-December, there were armed clashes and explosions, and an eight-year-old was killed when he got caught in the crossfire between Cameroonian troops and separatist fighters.

2021
On January 23, at least four civilians were killed in Bamenda.
On February 1, Cameroonian soldiers "neutralized" two armed separatists in Bamenda, and captured a separatist commander known as "General Sweet Tuma".
On February 3, three public employees were abducted by suspected separatists in Bamenda, allegedly for sealing shops whose owners respected separatist-imposed ghost towns.

On February 5, Cameroonian soldiers rescued four civilian hostages from a separatist camp at Ntanka, outside Bamenda. The Cameroonian Army reported to have suffered no casualties, and claimed that four separatist fighters were killed and four captured in the fighting. One of the dead insurgents was "General Lion". One civilian was wounded during the raid.
On February 8, two Cameroonian soldiers were killed in a separatist ambush.
On March 5, heavy fighting was reported in Bamenda.
On March 10, at least two Cameroonian soldiers were killed when separatists ambushed a military control post in Bamenda. Clashes were also recorded elsewhere in the city.
On April 4, a police officer was killed on the Bamenda-Bali road in a suspected separatist ambush.
On April 7, the head of the Disarmament, Demobilization, and Reintegration Centre in Bamenda was abducted from his home.
On April 18, following clashes with separatists Mile 90, Bamenda, Cameroonian soldiers entered a local bar and massacred at least five civilians.
On April 19, separatist commander "General Cobra" and four of his fighters were captured in Bamenda.
On April 30, there were clashes in the neighborhood of Rendezvous.
On May 8-9, soldiers freed at least four hostages in a raid on a separatist camp in Tanka, Bamenda. Neither side suffered casualties.
On May 26, separatist fighters shot a civilian multiple times, reportedly after he had publicly criticized their activities. He died from his wounds days later.
On July 4, Cameroonian soldiers killed a civilian at a police control post in Below Foncha, Bamenda. The killing sparked mass protests, during which civilians destroyed the control post.
On July 6, two separatist fighters were killed in Bamenda.
On July 19, separatist fighters were recorded dismembering a Cameroonian soldier in Bamenda.
On August 1, Cameroonian troops rescued a soldier from an Ambazonian detention facility, hours before his scheduled execution.
On August 7, three civilians were killed by suspected separatists in Mile 2 Nkwen, Bamenda.
On August 12, separatists abducted a man they accused of selling products that they had banned. The man was later killed in captivity.
On September 11, a police officer was killed in Bamenda.
On September 12, at least four separatist fighters were killed in Bamenda.
On October 1, the Cameroonian Army claimed to have killed a high-ranking soldier of the Bambalang Marine Forces.
On October 29, ADF commander "General Cross and Die" was killed in Bamenda.
On November 15, two separatists were killed during a shootout with police forces.
On November 19, separatists blew up a military vehicle in Bamenda with an IED, causing an unknown number of casualties. The ADF claimed responsibility.
On December 9, separatists ambushed a BIR convoy, and the ensuing gunfight saw the deaths of four separatist fighters.
On December 22, Cameroonian soldiers killed two civilian teenagers and injured one in Ngongham, Bamenda.

2022

On January 11, SDF senator Henry Kemende was killed in Bamenda. No one claimed responsibility.
On January 28, a Cameroonian police officer was shot dead by separatist fighters in Bamenda. The ADF claimed responsibility.
On February 25, the ADF abducted ten teachers from a school for disabled children in Ngomham, Bamenda.
 On February 26, suspected separatist fighters opened fire on a vehicle in Bamenda killing a nurse and wounding a doctor.
 On March 17, gunmen believed to be separatist fighters killed a man impersonating a fighter in Bamenda.
 On April 5, separatists attacked the University of Bamenda for defying a ghost town operation.
 On April 17, two civilians were killed following clashes between soldiers and separatists in Bamenda.
 On April 30, the ADF abducted Senator Regina Mundi of CPDM and her driver in Bamenda and asked Paul Biya to release 75 Ambazonian prisoners.
 On May 1, unknown gunmen kidnapped a lawyer in Bamenda.
 On May 8, the Cameroonian Army killed three people including two separatists in Bamenda.
 On May 16, clashes broke out in Bamenda and lasted for at least three days.
 On May 26, a BBC correspondent was kidnapped by gunmen in Bamenda.
 On June 11, a Cameroonian gendarme was killed and beheaded by separatists in Bamenda, and another one was wounded.
 On June 16, a Cameroonian gendarme was injured in a separatist attack and left to die by his attackers; he was later rescued by locals.
 On July 31, Cameroonian forces initiated a three-day, multi-front attack on the ADF in the Batibo district. Two separatist fighters known as "Colonel John" and "General Rasta" including 15 other ADF fighters were killed by the Cameroonian forces in Bambui, and another 18 were said to have been captured. The Cameroonian Army said that eleven of its forces were injured during the operation, while the ADF claimed to have killed "at least two dozen" soldiers. Local eyewitnesses reported losses on both sides, as well as civilian deaths. The ADF confirmed the death of eleven of their men, and said that they had cancelled an offensive in Bamenda involving 300 fighters due to the losses.
 On August 5, three people were killed (possibly summarily executed) by alleged Cameroonian soldiers in Bamenda.
 On September 8, at least four soldiers were killed in a separatist attack. The Butabu Kwifor and the Mankon Warrior claimed responsibility.
 On September 9, a soldier was shot dead by separatists.
 On September 10, Cameroonian forces invaded a vicinity and burnt down houses and shops to avenge the death of their colleagues killed two days ago by separatist fighters.
On November 5, Ambazonian soldiers shot and killed a businessman commonly known as King Boy in the Mbessi neighborhood in Bamenda.
 On January 11, SDF senator Henry Kemende was killed in Bamenda. No one claimed responsibility.

2023

 On January 4, a Cameroonian gendarme was killed by separatist fighters. The ADF claimed responsibility.

Alleged abuses 

In late-September, the Cameroon Bar Association accused the army of extorsion and intimidation of civilians, arbitrary arrests, assault, torture, and denying detained persons access to lawyers. Similar concerns were voiced by locals on the same day as the operation started. Brig. Gen. Valere Nka denied the accusations and said that the army respected human rights.

References 

Anglophone Crisis
Military history of Cameroon
2020 in Cameroon
2020 military operations